Mario Larocque (born April 24, 1978) is a Canadian former professional ice hockey defenceman.

Playing career
As a youth, Larocque played in the 1992 Quebec International Pee-Wee Hockey Tournament with a minor ice hockey team from Montreal.

Larocque was drafted in the first round, 16th overall by the Tampa Bay Lightning in 1996. He managed to play five NHL games for the Lightning during the 1998–99 NHL season, scoring no points with 16 penalty minutes. He spent the rest of that season in the International Hockey League with the Cleveland Lumberjacks before playing two seasons with the Detroit Vipers of the same league.  After the IHL folded, he was signed by the Buffalo Sabres but was assigned to the American Hockey League with the Rochester Americans and never saw any ice time with the Sabres.

He spent the next five seasons in the ECHL with the Wheeling Nailers and the United Hockey League with the Danbury Trashers and the Fort Wayne Komets, along with brief spells in the AHL for the Wilkes-Barre/Scranton Penguins and the Bridgeport Sound Tigers. In 2007, he joined Austrian team HC TWK Innsbruck and in September 2008 he signed with Sport Ghiaccio Pontebba. He then joined the EC Red Bull Salzburg on December 1, 2008, and later signed with the Nottingham Panthers on November 5, 2009.

Larocque signed with the Muskegon Lumberjacks on February 12, 2010. Larocque joined the Evansville IceMen in October 2010, after the team relocated from Muskegon, for his 13th pro season and first full campaign under Head Coach Rich Kromm after finishing last season with Kromm in Muskegon.

On January 15, 2014, Larocque opted for another venture abroad signing for the remainder of the season with the Braehead Clan of the EIHL.

Career statistics

References

External links

1978 births
Living people
Arizona Sundogs players
Braehead Clan players
Bridgeport Sound Tigers players
Canadian ice hockey defencemen
Cleveland Lumberjacks players
Danbury Trashers players
Detroit Vipers players
Elmira Jackals (ECHL) players
Evansville IceMen players
Fort Wayne Komets players
HC TWK Innsbruck players
Hull Olympiques players
Ice hockey people from Montreal
Muskegon Lumberjacks players
National Hockey League first-round draft picks
Nottingham Panthers players
Rochester Americans players
SG Pontebba players
Sherbrooke Faucons players
Stockton Thunder players
Tampa Bay Lightning draft picks
Tampa Bay Lightning players
Wheeling Nailers players
Wilkes-Barre/Scranton Penguins players
Canadian expatriate ice hockey players in England
Canadian expatriate ice hockey players in Scotland
Canadian expatriate ice hockey players in Austria
Canadian expatriate ice hockey players in Italy
Canadian expatriate ice hockey players in the United States